Leggit Lake is a small alpine lake in Elmore County, Idaho, United States, located in the Sawtooth Mountains in the Sawtooth National Recreation Area about  southeast of Atlanta, Idaho.  Sawtooth National Forest trail 484 leads to the lake.

Leggit Lake is at the southern tip of the Sawtooth Wilderness, and a wilderness permit can be obtained at a registration box at trailheads or wilderness boundaries.

References

See also
 List of lakes of the Sawtooth Mountains (Idaho)
 Sawtooth National Forest
 Sawtooth National Recreation Area
 Sawtooth Range (Idaho)

Lakes of Idaho
Lakes of Elmore County, Idaho
Glacial lakes of the United States
Glacial lakes of the Sawtooth Wilderness